20 Fantastic Hits is a compilation album that reached number 1 in the UK. It is a notable album in that it was the first ever - and ultimately most successful - LP by compilation label Arcade Records.

Track listing 
Rod Stewart - Maggie May
The Osmonds - One Bad Apple
The Mixtures - The Pushbike Song
Melanie - Brand New Key
Vanity Fare - Early in the Morning
Slade - Coz I Luv You
The Piglets - Johnny Reggae
Johnny Johnson and the Bandwagon - Blame it On the Pony Express
The Bee Gees - My World
Dawn - Candida
The New Seekers - Beg, Steal or Borrow
The Delfonics - La La Means I Love You
The Hollies - The Baby
Donny Osmond - Puppy Love
Edison Lighthouse - Love Grows (Where My Rosemary Goes)
Lou Christie - I'm Gonna Make You Mine
Barry Ryan - Can't Let You Go
Daniel Boone - Beautiful Sunday
Melanie - What Have They Done To My Song Ma?
Chelsea Football Club - Blue Is The Colour

A second and third volume were subsequently released.

References

1972 compilation albums
Rock compilation albums
Funk compilation albums
Soul compilation albums
Arcade Records compilation albums